The 1974 Holy Cross Crusaders football team was an American football team that represented the College of the Holy Cross as an independent during the 1974 NCAA Division I football season. Ed Doherty returned for his fourth year as head coach. The team compiled a record of 5–5–1.

All home games were played at Fitton Field on the Holy Cross campus in Worcester, Massachusetts.

Schedule

Statistical leaders
Statistical leaders for the 1974 Crusaders included: 
 Rushing: Steve Hunt, 427 yards on 104 attempts
 Passing: Bob Morton, 1,077 yards, 101 completions and 8 touchdowns on 188 attempts
 Receiving: Dave Quehl, 801 yards and 6 touchdowns on 62 receptions
 Scoring: Jerry Kelley, 42 points from 21 PATs and 7 field goals
 Total offense: Bob Morton, 1,483 yards (1,077 passing, 406 rushing)
 All-purpose yards: Dave Quehl, 807 yards (801 receiving, 6 returning)
 Interceptions: John Provost, 10 interceptions for 157 yards

References

Holy Cross
Holy Cross Crusaders football seasons
Holy Cross Crusaders football